Tianjin Kerry Centre is a residential complex home to three skyscrapers, Tianjian Kerry Centre Towers 1-3. The complex was designed by Skidmore, Owings & Merrill, and construction was completed in 2014 after beginning in 2009.

Kerry Centre was developed by Kerry Properties.

See also
Skyscraper design and construction
List of tallest buildings in China

References

External links
 

Buildings and structures in Tianjin
Residential buildings completed in 2014
Skidmore, Owings & Merrill buildings